The Human Rights Trust of Southern Africa, better known as  SAHRIT,  is a human rights groups established in October 2006 to promote human rights in Southern Africa. It has its headquarters in Harare.

External links
Sahrit (official Website)
African review

Human rights organisations based in Zimbabwe
Civil rights organizations
International human rights organizations
Organizations established in 2006
2006 establishments in Zimbabwe